Phalloceros is a genus of poeciliids native to freshwater habitats in Brazil, Paraguay, Uruguay and northern Argentina. The majority are endemic to southern and southeastern Brazil (only exceptions are P. caudimaculatus, P. harpagos and P. leticiae). P. caudimaculatus has long been part of the aquarium industry and has been introduced to countries far from its native range.

Species
There are currently 22 recognized species in this genus:
 Phalloceros alessandrae Lucinda, 2008
 Phalloceros anisophallos Lucinda, 2008
 Phalloceros aspilos Lucinda, 2008
 Phalloceros buckupi Lucinda, 2008
 Phalloceros caudimaculatus (R. F. Hensel, 1868) (Dusky millions fish)
 Phalloceros elachistos Lucinda, 2008
 Phalloceros enneaktinos Lucinda, 2008
 Phalloceros harpagos Lucinda, 2008
 Phalloceros heptaktinos Lucinda, 2008
 Phalloceros leptokeras Lucinda, 2008
 Phalloceros leticiae Lucinda, 2008
 Phalloceros lucenorum Lucinda, 2008
 Phalloceros malabarbai Lucinda, 2008
 Phalloceros megapolos Lucinda, 2008
 Phalloceros mikrommatos Lucinda, 2008
 Phalloceros ocellatus Lucinda, 2008
 Phalloceros pellos Lucinda, 2008
 Phalloceros reisi Lucinda, 2008
 Phalloceros spiloura Lucinda, 2008
 Phalloceros titthos Lucinda, 2008
 Phalloceros tupinamba Lucinda, 2008
 Phalloceros uai Lucinda, 2008

References

Poeciliidae
Fish of South America
Freshwater fish genera
Taxa named by Carl H. Eigenmann
Ray-finned fish genera